is a pinball video game developed by Wolf Team for the Sega Mega Drive/Genesis. It was released in 1991 in North America and Japan.

Summary
This game had a quest mode that spanned three pinball areas: Rescue the kidnapped girlfriend from Dino-Mike by completing boards based on the themes of Land, Water and Air. It also featured hitting dinosaurs with a pinball, and three bosses. The North American release was published by Renovation Products in 1991.

External links
Dino Land at GameFAQs

1991 video games
Pinball video games
Sega Genesis games
X68000 games
Telenet Japan games
Video games developed in Japan
Wolf Team games
Dinosaurs in video games
Single-player video games